Osvaldo Palazzi was an Italian gymnast.

He took part in the fifth Gymnastics World Championships, which took place in 1911, where Italy won bronze in the team competition. Individually, he took gold in the pommel horse. In the next World Championships, in 1913, Palazzi won silver in the pommel horse (behind Giorgio Zampori) and bronze in the horizontal bar. He also took bronze again in the team competition with the Italian team.

Italian male artistic gymnasts
Date of birth unknown
Date of death unknown